Alec Taylor may refer to:

 Alec Taylor, Sr. (1825–1895), British Thoroughbred horse trainer
 Alec Taylor, Jr. (1862–1943), British Thoroughbred racehorse trainer
 Alec Taylor (cricketer) (born 1975), Zimbabwean cricketer
 Alec Tayler (1892–1964), Australian rules footballer